Jand (also Jend), was a medieval town on the right bank of the lower Jaxartes river in Transoxiana in modern-day Kazakhstan. It was the winter capital of the Seljuk Turks before their migration to Khurasan. It was later sacked by the Mongols, and is now in ruins.

See also
 Sighnaq

References
 C.F. Bosworth, The Ghaznavids, Edinburgh, 1963.

Historical geography
Former populated cities in Kazakhstan